The Imani School is a Christian private elementary and middle school in the Power Center, a multi-purpose complex in the 5 Corners District, and in  Southwest Houston, Texas, United States. The school is marketed to African-American children, and it is one of the ministries of the Windsor Village United Methodist Church.

History

The Imani School was founded in 1988. It is an independent 501(c)3. It opened in the northern hemisphere fall of that year in the church facility. When the school opened, it had 25 students. The name "Imani" is a Swahili word that means "faith" or "to believe."

In 1993 those two buildings were vacant. In addition to the school, the church also planned to allow a bank, a medical clinic, several African-American owned businesses, and a job training center lease spaces in the center. In 1994 it had 236 and covered grades kindergarten through 5. Within the original church building, the school had grown so large that some components of the community center, including the food pantry and clothing resale shop, had been relocated to another building, while the AIDS ministry, the fellowship hall, and several social services divisions remained in the building. The Power Center was completed in 1995. In 1996 Imani had 250 students.

Patricia Hogan Williams, the director of the school, said in 1998 that dropout rates among black students in public schools were "so high, we realized they weren't being taken care of[...]" and that the school aimed to cater to the needs of black students. That year the principal said that 90% of the graduates of the Imani school attend gifted and talented programs at public high schools.

See also

 Corinthian Pointe
 History of the African-Americans in Houston
 Christianity in Houston

References

External links

 The Imani School

African-American history in Houston
Private K–8 schools in Houston
1988 establishments in Texas
Educational institutions established in 1988
Christian schools in Houston